Cynthia Gouw (born May 30, 1963) is an American actress, model, and TV news anchor and host.

Biography
One of Gouw's great grandfathers moved from Xiamen, China to Indonesia, where he started a department store chain. Her parents, both Chinese immigrants from Indonesia, went to university in the Netherlands and moved to California in 1961. In 1963, she became the first in her family to be born in the US. 

She grew up with her parents and brother in El Cerrito, California and graduated from the high school there in 1981. She then attended UCLA, where she majored in political science and international relations and minored in Asian American studies. She also edited Pacific Ties, UCLA's Asian-American newspaper and interned for Willie Brown. In 1991, she graduated from UCLA School of Law.

Career

Modeling
She entered Miss LA Chinatown on an assignment for Pacific Ties in 1984 but ended up winning the pageant and moving on to win Miss Chinatown USA the following year. She won the Spokesmodel competition on Star Search in 1988, the first Asian American to do so.

In 2005, she placed third in the More Magazine and Wilhelmina  40+Model Search. She has been a spokesperson for L'Oréal.

Acting
She appeared as Romulan Ambassador Caithlin Dar in the movie Star Trek V: The Final Frontier, China Beach, and Matlock.

Journalism and broadcasting
Throughout her career, Gouw has worked as a reporter and/or news anchor for KTVU, E!, Channel 26, Continental Cablevision, KXTV, KDFW, CBS, KERO-TV, KABC-TV, and NPR San Francisco. She was previously a reporter for Pacific Time and was KDFW's first Asian-American news anchor.

In 1996, while working for Channel 10 in Sacramento, she won a Regional Emmy for her feature Is Your Kid in a Gang?. She won another award the following year with photographer Mike Garza for their work on The Promised Land, a feature about illegal immigration. 

In 1998, she won a third Emmy for Hong Kong: The California Connection in the current affairs programming category. She has also won 4 Society of Professional Journalism Awards and was honored with a "Best TV Talk Show Series in the State" nod from the Pennsylvania Association of Broadcasters. In Philadelphia, Gouw hosted Asian Outlook, a half-hour talk show focused on the affairs of the Pacific Rim for WYBE.

Gouw was named Member of the Year by the Chinese American Council and Honoree of the Year by the Asian Bar Association of Sacramento. She has also been recognized by the California State Legislature, and is on the Advisory Board of Stanford University's "Grade the News".

Personal life
She has a daughter and two step-children. Her husband Doug Alexander is a businessman and one of the original board members of Actua Corporation, and has been in senior management positions in a number of start-ups and Actua spinoffs. She briefly dated Prince Andrew in the 2000s.

Filmography

References

External links
 
 

Living people
1963 births
Indonesian people of Chinese descent
Television anchors from Los Angeles
Television anchors from Sacramento, California
Television anchors from San Francisco
American journalists of Chinese descent
Actresses from Berkeley, California
American women television journalists
American women journalists of Asian descent
UCLA School of Law alumni
University of California, Los Angeles alumni
21st-century American women